The anime series Mr. Tonegawa: Middle Management Blues is based on the manga series Chūkan Kanriroku Tonegawa, written by Tensei Hagiwara and illustrated by Tomohiro Hashimoto and Tomoki Miyoshi. It is a spin-off of  the main series Kaiji by Nobuyuki Fukumoto. Animated by Madhouse, it was broadcast for twenty-four episodes on AnichU programming block from July 4 to December 26, 2018.

Sentai Filmworks  licensed the series and an English dub began streaming on Hidive on August 3, 2018.

The series also includes segments from 1-nichi Gaishutsuroku Hanchō spin-off manga about the foreman Ōtsuki.


Episode list

Notes

References

Mr. Tonegawa: Middle Management Blues